The Willis Building (originally the Willis Faber & Dumas regional headquarters) in Ipswich, Suffolk, England, is one of the earliest buildings designed by Norman Foster and Wendy Cheesman after establishing Foster Associates. Constructed between 1970 and 1975 for the insurance firm now known as Willis Towers Watson, it is now seen as a landmark in the development of the 'high tech' architectural style. The building houses some 1,300 office staff in open-plan offices spread over three floors.

Location
The bulbous floor plan of the office block reflects the layout of the available site in the centre of Ipswich, which is sandwiched between several road junctions and the Grade I listed Unitarian Meeting House, one of Ipswich's oldest surviving buildings. Thus two of the town's Grade I listed buildings stand side by side.

Design

The centre of the building is constructed from a grid of concrete pillars, 14 m (46 ft) apart, supporting cantilevered concrete slab floors. The curtain wall exterior is clad in panels of dark smoked glass. The use of dark glass, a curtain wall and lack of right angle corners mirrors the art deco Express Building in Manchester, cited by Norman Foster as one of his favourite buildings and a design influence. The central escalator well leads up to a rooftop staff restaurant surrounded by a rooftop garden (360 panorama).

Originally, there was also a swimming pool for employees to enjoy during their lunch break. This has now been covered up (not filled in due to it being a listed building) and the space is used for more offices. The swimming pool can be seen underneath the false floor.

History
In 1991 the Willis building became the youngest building to be given Grade I listed building status in Britain. At the time it was one of only two listed buildings under 30 years of age.

See also
 List of tallest buildings and structures in Ipswich

References 

 ConcreteCentre.com
 Project description from Foster + Partner

External links 

 BBC Four episode of series Building Sights on the Willis Building, presented by Zaha Hadid

 

Office buildings completed in 1975
Grade I listed buildings in Ipswich
Grade I listed office buildings
Foster and Partners buildings
Office buildings in Ipswich